Guffie is an unincorporated community located in McLean County, Kentucky, United States. It was also known as Littles Crossroads.

In 2017 Guffie Lake (operated by the local fish and game) had a catastrophic Dam breach.  Resulting in the lake completely draining.  The cause is unknown at this time and repairs to the Dam have not yet taken place.  No injuries were reported.

References

Unincorporated communities in McLean County, Kentucky
Unincorporated communities in Kentucky